Anton Neininger (born August 10, 1950) is a former Swiss ice hockey player who played for the Switzerland men's national ice hockey team at the 1972 and 1976 Olympics.

External links

Anton Neininger statistics at Sports-Reference.com

1950 births
Swiss ice hockey forwards
Olympic ice hockey players of Switzerland
Living people
Ice hockey players at the 1972 Winter Olympics
Ice hockey players at the 1976 Winter Olympics